Dr. Corina L. Apostol is an art curator and writer from Constanța, Romania. Having been a curator at Tallinn Art Hall since 2019, she is the curator of the Estonian pavilion at the 59th Venice Biennale held in 2022. Her work has been recognised with nominations for the 2015 Fondation Prince Pierre de Monaco Prize, the 2016 Kandinsky Prize, and the 2020 Sergey Kuryokhin Award.

Education 
Corina Apostol received a Bachelor of Art major in Art History, History and minor in Visual Studies at the Duke University. She obtained a Master's degree and a Ph.D. in Art History at Rutgers University.

Career
Apostol is a curator at the Tallinn Art Hall. She is the cofounder of the activist publishing collective ArtLeaks. Between 2010 and 2017 she was the Norton Dodge Curatorial Fellow at the Zimmerli Art Museum at Rutgers University, researching and exhibiting The Norton and Nancy Dodge Collection of Soviet Nonconformist Art. She contributed to the 2014 book Truth is Concrete: A Handbook for Artistic Strategies in Real Politics, edited by Anne Faucheret and Florian Malzacher.

In 2016, she was selected as part of the Board of Directors of the Romanian National Cultural Fund. She wrote the chapter "The Art of Making Community" in Area Studies in the Global Age: Community, Place, Identity (Eds. Edith Clowes, Shelly Jarrett Bromberg, 2016), about Romanian artist Lia Perjovschi. Between 2017 and 2019 she was the Andrew W. Mellon Fellow at Creative Time. That same year co-edited together with Nato Thompson the book Making Another World Possible: 10 Creative Time Summits, 10 Global Issues, 100 Art Projects, published by Routledge.

In 2020, she was selected as the curator for the Estonian Pavilion at the 59th Venice Biennale. The project, entitled "Orchidelirium: An Appetite for Abundance", will present artworks by contemporary artists Kristina Norman, Bita Razavi and the botanical artists Emilie Rosalie Saal.

Recognition
In 2016, Apostol was longlisted for the Kandinsky Prize in the category “Scholarly work. Contemporary art history and theory.”, and in 2020 she was on the longlist of the Sergey Kuryokhin Award for "Best Curatorial Project".

References 

Living people
Duke University alumni
Rutgers University alumni
People from Constanța
21st-century Romanian women
Romanian art curators
Year of birth missing (living people)
Romanian women curators